Tímea Babos and Sloane Stephens were the defending champions but were no longer eligible to compete as juniors.

Eugenie Bouchard and Grace Min defeated Demi Schuurs and Tang Haochen in the final, 5–7, 6–2, 7–5 to win the girls' doubles tennis title at the 2011 Wimbledon Championships.

Seeds

  Daria Gavrilova /  Daria Salnikova (withdrew)
  Eugenie Bouchard /  Grace Min (champions)
  Barbara Haas /  Anett Kontaveit (second round)
  Ashleigh Barty /  Miho Kowase (quarterfinals, withdrew)
  Victoria Duval /  Zarah Razafimahatratra (second round)
  Jesika Malečková /  Chantal Škamlová (second round)
  Victoria Bosio /  Patricia Kú Flores (first round)
  Montserrat González /  Ganna Poznikhirenko (second round)

Draw

Finals

Top half

Bottom half

References

External links

Girls' Doubles
Wimbledon Championship by year – Girls' doubles